Zhou Yun (born 31 December 1990) is a retired Chinese professional footballer who had only played for Chinese Super League club Jiangsu in his entire career.

Club career
Zhou Yun played for Jiangsu Sainty's academy until he was promoted to the senior team during the 2008 season. At the time, the club was competing in the second-tier League One and had already won the division title and promotion to the top tier. Jiangsu's manager Pei Encai decided to give Zhou his debut in the final game of the season against Yantai Yiteng on 15 November 2008 in a 2–0 victory. Zhou spent the following season on the bench as Pei Encai decided to stick with experienced players to keep Jiangsu in the Super League. In the 2010 season Zhou was given his chance to become a regular within the team. He played sixteen league games at the end of the season and helped guide the club to a mid-table finish. Zhou went on to become a vital member of the team's defence in 2011 as the club finished in their highest ever position of fourth. This would be followed by a 2015 Chinese FA Cup victory against Shanghai Shenhua.

On 28 February 2021, Suning Holdings Group halted their operations in Jiangsu Football Club due to financial predicament. On 30 March 2021, Zhou announced his retirement at the age of 30, one day after Jiangsu, as defending champions of the competition, was disqualified in entering new season's Chinese Super league.

International career
Zhou was called up to the Chinese national team for the first time when he was included in the squad for a 2015 AFC Asian Cup qualifying match against Iraq that was held on 22 March 2013, however he did not play. Zhou made his debut in a friendly against Uzbekistan on 6 June 2013 in a 2–1 defeat.

Career statistics 
Statistics accurate as of match played 5 December 2020.

Honours

Club
Jiangsu Sainty
Chinese Super League: 2020
China League One: 2008
Chinese FA Cup: 2015
Chinese FA Super Cup: 2013

References

External links
 
 

1990 births
Living people
Chinese footballers
Footballers from Jiangsu
Jiangsu F.C. players
Chinese Super League players
China League One players
Footballers at the 2010 Asian Games
Sportspeople from Suzhou
China international footballers
Association football defenders
Asian Games competitors for China